José Alejandro Butto (born March 19, 1998) is a Venezuelan professional baseball pitcher for the New York Mets of Major League Baseball (MLB).

Career
Butto signed with the New York Mets as an international free agent in June 2017. The Mets added him to their 40-man roster after the 2021 season.

Butto was optioned to the Triple-A Syracuse Mets to begin the 2023 season.

References

External links

1998 births
Living people
Binghamton Rumble Ponies players
Brooklyn Cyclones players
Columbia Fireflies players
Dominican Summer League Mets players
Kingsport Mets players
Major League Baseball pitchers
Major League Baseball players from Venezuela
New York Mets players
Syracuse Mets players
Venezuelan expatriate baseball players in the Dominican Republic
Venezuelan expatriate baseball players in the United States